The 1st Infantry Brigade is an infantry brigade of the Estonian Land Forces. It is the primary military unit in Northern Estonia. The brigade headquarters is based at Tapa.

History
On 25 April 1917, the 2nd Naval Fortress Regiment of the Peter the Great's Naval Fortress was formed in Tallinn, recruited from Estonians. In May 1917, the regiment was renamed 1st Estonian Infantry Regiment. From 1918 to 1920, the unit fought in the Estonian War of Independence. The unit was disbanded after the Soviet occupation in 1940.

On 1 February 2003, the 1st Infantry Brigade was formed in Tallinn. In 2006, the brigade headquarters was moved to Paldiski. On 1 January 2009, the brigade was formed around three battalions: Scouts Battalion, Kalev Infantry Battalion, and the Combat Service Support Battalion. On 1 August 2014, Viru Infantry Battalion, Engineer Battalion, Air Defence Battalion and Artillery Battalion of the former North-Eastern Defence District were added to the 1st Infantry Brigade and headquarters was moved to Tapa.

Current structure
 1st Infantry Brigade:
 Headquarters (Tapa)
 Headquarters Support and Signal Company (Tapa)
 Scouts Battalion (Tapa)
 Kalev Infantry Battalion (Jõhvi)
 Viru Infantry Battalion (Jõhvi)
 Artillery Battalion (Tapa)
 Air Defence Battalion (Tapa)
 Engineer Battalion (Tapa)
 Combat Service Support Battalion (Tapa)
 Anti-Tank Company (Jõhvi)
 Reconnaissance Company (Tapa)

Around 1800 conscripts are serving at different units of the brigade at the same time along with professional soldiers.

Equipment
Brigade units is armed with CV90 infantry fighting vehicles, Pasi armoured personnel carriers, FH70 and D30 howitzers, Mistral and ZU-23-2 anti-aircraft systems and Javelin anti-tank missiles. The Brigade uses a fleet of MB Unimog, MB Actros, Volvo FMX, DAF trucks, BV-206 amphibious carriers and MB GD240 jeeps.

List of commanders
Toivo Treima 16 June 2003 – 1 August 2005
Aivar Kokka (acting) 2 August 2005 – 31 March 2006
Raivo Lumiste 1 April 2006 – 5 September 2006
Artur Tiganik 18 September 2006 – 7 April 2009
Märt Plakk (acting) 8 April 2009 – 30 June 2009
Margus Rebane (acting) 1 July 2009 – 23 August 2009
 24 August 2009 – 2 October 2010
Urmas Nigul 3 October 2010 – 31 July 2012
Aron Kalmus 1 August 2012 – 31 July 2015
Veiko-Vello Palm 1 August 2015 – 3 August 2018
Vahur Karus 3 August 2018 – 17 June 2021
Andrus Merilo 17 June 2021 - present

See also
Estonian Land Forces
2nd Infantry Brigade

References

External links
 Official website 

Infantry brigades of Estonia
Military units and formations established in 2003
2003 establishments in Estonia